The ICW Women's World Championship is a women's professional wrestling championship owned by Scotland's Insane Championship Wrestling promotion. Rhio is the current champion in her first reign. She won the title by defeating Molly Spartan on February 26, 2023, at ICW: Square Go 11 in Glasgow, Scotland

History
The title was first announced by then ICW General Manager, Red Lightning, on May 31, 2015, with an 8 women tournament being held over the coming months.  The final took place at Fear & Loathing VIII on November 15, 2015, with Viper (who had been added to the match by ICW Commissioner, Mick Foley) emerging victorious and becoming the inaugural ICW Women's Champion.

ICW Women's Championship Tournament (2021)

Reigns

Combined reigns

See also
Insane Championship Wrestling
ICW World Heavyweight Championship
ICW Zero-G Championship
ICW Tag Team Championship

References

External links
  ICW Women's World Championship

Insane Championship Wrestling championships
Women's professional wrestling championships